The mantis family Amelidae was previously placed in the family Mantidae. Species have been recorded from Africa, Asia, Europe and North America.

Genera
The Mantodea Species File lists a single subfamily Amelinae, comprising two tribes:

Amelini 
 Ameles Burmeister, 1838
 Apteromantis Werner, 1931
 Pseudoyersinia Kirby, 1904

Litaneutriini 
 Litaneutria Saussure, 1892 
 Yersinia Saussure, 1869 - monotypic Yersinia mexicana Saussure, 1859
 Yersiniops Hebard, 1931

Fossil species 

 Litaneutria pilosuspedes Terriquez et al. 2022

References

External links 

Mantodea
Mantodea families